The Most is the third album released by straight edge hardcore punk band Down to Nothing. It was released on July 17, 2007.

Track listing
Along for the Ride – 1:06  
Conquer the World – 2:25  
My Disguise – 2:44  
No Faith – 0:35  
Serve and Neglect – 2:42  
Down on You – 1:19  
Well Deserved – 1:56  
Running Out – 1:43  
Higher Learning – 2:18  
Your Loss, Your Regrets – 2:54  
Up River (Feat. Patrick Flynn of Have Heart) – 1:34  
Quick to Judge – 1:39

Personnel

Production
 Mastered By – Paul Miner
 Producer – Jim Siegel

2007 albums
Down to Nothing albums